Norsworthy is a surname. Notable people with the surname include:

Barry Norsworthy (1951–2021), Australian rules footballer
Hubert Henry Norsworthy (1885–1961), English organist and composer
Naomi Norsworthy (1877–1916), American psychologist
Ron Norsworthy, American production designer